Chicoreus allaryi is a species of sea snail, a marine gastropod mollusk in the family Muricidae, the murex snails or rock snails.

Description
 Size 7–11 cm.

Distribution
This marine species occurs off Madagascar

References

Description of a new species of Chicoreus (Triplex) (Gastropoda: Muricidae) from Madagascar. Novapex 5(4): 143-146

Muricidae
Gastropods described in 2004